Kategoria Superiore U-21, also called U-21 Superiore, is a reserve league competition for football clubs in Albania. The league was formed in November 2020 and the first season comprised 13 teams which is due to end on 19 May 2021.

List of champions

Teams

References 

Kategoria Superiore U-21
Kategoria Superiore
Youth football leagues in Europe
Reserve football leagues in Europe